Pierson is an English surname, meaning "son of Piers". Notable people with the surname include: 

Abraham Pierson, the elder (died 1678), English pastor in New England
Abraham Pierson (1646-1707), pastor, and first rector and a founder of what would become Yale University, son of Abraham Pierson, the elder
Albert H. Pierson (1839–1918), American farmer, teacher, and politician
Arthur Tappan Pierson, Presbyterian pastor and author
Christoffel Pierson (1631–1714), Dutch painter
Clara D. Pierson, American children's book author
DC Pierson, American comedian, author, and actor
Don Pierson, American broadcasting pioneer
Emma Pierson (born 1981), British actress
Emily Pierson (1881-1971), American suffragist and physician
Frank Pierson, American film director
Henry Hugh Pierson , composer  (1815-1873)
Henry R. Pierson (1819–1890), New York politician
Isaac Pierson (1770–1833), Representative to US Congress from New Jersey
Jean Pierson (1940–2021), French aerospace engineer and executive
Julia Pierson, the 23rd Director of the U. S. Secret Service
Kate Pierson, American singer, of The B-52's
Leander J. Pierson, American politician
Melissa Holbrook Pierson, American author
Nicolaas Pierson, the 23rd Prime Minister of the Netherlands
Philippe Pierson, Belgian Jesuit
Rex Pierson, English aircraft designer
Robert H. Pierson, former president of the General Conference of Seventh-day Adventists
William Pierson (1926–2004), American actor
William Pierson, Jr. (1911–2008), American painter
William Pierson (baseball) (1899–1959), American baseball player

See also
Peirson, given name and surname
Pearson (surname)